Matthias Hummel (born 3 November 1984) is a German former footballer who played as a centre-back, and current assistant manager of TSV Bordesholm.

Career
Hummel made his professional debut in the 3. Liga for Holstein Kiel on 2 October 2009, coming on as a substitute in the 70th minute for Kevin Schulz in the 2–0 home win against VfB Stuttgart II.

After retiring from playing football in 2016, Hummel became the technical director of ETSV Weiche Flensburg. In 2017, he was appointed as the assistant manager of TSV Bordesholm.

References

External links
 Profile at DFB.de
 Profile at kicker.de

1984 births
Living people
People from Troisdorf
Sportspeople from Cologne (region)
Footballers from North Rhine-Westphalia
German footballers
German football managers
Association football central defenders
Holstein Kiel players
SC Weiche Flensburg 08 players
3. Liga players
Regionalliga players
Holstein Kiel II players